Hans Patrik Eklund (born 16 April 1969) is a Swedish football manager, and former football player. In his active career, Eklund played seven games for the Sweden national football team and was the 1992 Allsvenskan top scorer.

Club career 
Eklund started his career at Mönsterås GIF. In 1987, he moved to Östers IF. With 16 goals in the 1992 Allsvenskan season, he was the league top goal-scorer. He stayed at Östers until 1997, when he moved abroad to play for Servette FC in Switzerland. He moved on to Chinese club Dalian Wanda, before playing for Viborg FF in Denmark. Eklund secured Viborg their first nationwide title, when he scored the only goal as Viborg beat Aalborg BK 1–0 in the 2000 Danish Cup final. He returned to Sweden, to play for Helsingborgs IF. Eklund ended his career in 2003.

International career 
Eklund represented the Sweden U17, U19, and U21 teams a combined total of 33 times, scoring 15 goals. He made his full international debut for Sweden on 12 January 1988, in a friendly 4–1 win against East Germany when he replaced Leif Engqvist in the 71st minute. He made his first and only competitive appearance for Sweden on 19 May 1993 in a 1994 FIFA World Cup qualifier against Austria, replacing Martin Dahlin in the 86th minute of a 1–0 win. He won his seventh and final cap on 24 February 1994 in a friendly game against Mexico, playing for 87 minutes before being replaced by Anders Andersson in a 1–2 loss.

Managerial career
As he ended his active career, Eklund was hired as youth team coach at Helsingborgs IF. He was later promoted to assistant coach for the team. In November 2007, he was hired as manager of his former team Viborg FF. He was fired in April 2009 due to mixed results. In December 2009 it was announced that he would join Landskrona BoIS, working as an assistant manager.

Career statistics

International 
Appearances and goals by national team and year

Honours

Manager
Falkenbergs FF
Superettan: 2013

References

Sources
 
  
 

1969 births
Living people
People from Mönsterås Municipality
Swedish footballers
Association football forwards

Sweden under-21 international footballers
Sweden international footballers
Östers IF players
Servette FC players
Dalian Shide F.C. players
Viborg FF players
Helsingborgs IF players

Swedish expatriate footballers
Expatriate footballers in Switzerland
Expatriate footballers in China
Expatriate men's footballers in Denmark
Swedish expatriate sportspeople in Switzerland
Swedish expatriate sportspeople in China
Swedish expatriate sportspeople in Denmark

Allsvenskan players
Swiss Super League players
Danish Superliga players
Swedish expatriate football managers
Expatriate football managers in Denmark
Allsvenskan managers
Superettan managers

Swedish football managers
Helsingborgs IF managers
Viborg FF managers
Landskrona BoIS non-playing staff
Falkenbergs FF managers
Kalmar FF managers
Sportspeople from Kalmar County